Il Bolaghi (also Romanized as Īl Bolāghī and  Īlbolāghī; also known as Shāh Bolāghī) is a village in Qarah Quyun-e Jonubi Rural District, Qarah Quyun District, Showt County, West Azerbaijan Province, Iran. At the 2006 census, its population was 503, in 124 families.

References 

Populated places in Showt County